Jung-ah, also spelled Jeong-ah, is a Korean feminine given name. The meaning differs based on the hanja used to write each syllable of the name. There are 75 hanja with the reading "jung" and 29 hanja with the reading "ah" on the South Korean government's official list of hanja which may be used in given names.

Sung Jung-a (born 1965), South Korean basketball player
Koo Jeong-a (born 1967), South Korean visual artist
Seok Jung-ah (born 1971), South Korean volleyball player
Shin Jeong-ah (born 1972), South Korean art professor
Yum Jung-ah (born 1972), South Korean actress
Park Jung-ah (born 1981), South Korean singer, former member of girl group Jewelry
Kim Jung-ah (born 1983), South Korean idol singer, member of After School
Sunwoo Jung-a (born 1985), South Korean singer
Park Jeong-ah (volleyball) (born 1993), South Korean volleyball player

See also
List of Korean given names

References

Korean feminine given names